Epanolol is a beta blocker.

References

Beta blockers
Phenols
Benzamides
Nitriles
Phenoxypropanolamines